The Sound of Music is an album by American power pop group The dB's, released in 1987 on I.R.S. Records.

The album peaked at No. 171 on the Billboard 200.

Production
The Sound of Music was produced by Greg Edward. Van Dyke Parks and Benmont Tench contributed piano, organ, and synthesizer to the album.

Critical reception
Trouser Press wrote: "The Sound of Music finds the dB’s continuing in the style of Like This, with similarly fine results. The country elements reappear on 'Bonneville' (complete with fiddles and mandolins), 'Never Before and Never Again' (a brilliant [Peter] Holsapple duet with Syd Straw) and 'Looked at the Sun Too Long,' which could easily be mistaken for a Gram Parsons tune." The Washington Post wrote that "without the counterpoint provided by [Chris] Stamey's more adventurous songs, Holsapple's full-bodied but conventional tunes have drifted toward the insipid." The Rolling Stone Album Guide called the album "polished" but "not entirely convincing." The Spin Alternative Record Guide called it "catchy but complacent."

Track listing
 "Never Say When"
 "Change with the Changing Times"
 "I Lie"
 "Molly Says"
 "Bonneville"
 "Any Old Thing"
 "Think Too Hard"
 "Working for Somebody Else"
 "Never Before and Never Again"
 "A Better Place"
 "Looked at the Sun Too Long"
 "Today Could Be the Day"

CD bonus tracks
"Feel Alright"
 "Sharon"

References

1987 albums
I.R.S. Records albums
The dB's albums